Pécs 2010 is a defunct women's professional Basketball team based in Pécs, Hungary. It used to play in the NB I/A, the top division championship in the country and in EuroLeague Women from its foundation until 2011. 
The club ceased to exist in the summer of 2012 due to financial reasons. However, two other clubs were founded in the city, that took over the players, coaches and managers of Pécs 2010. These two new clubs are PEAC-Pécs and PINKK-Pécsi 424; they are competing in the NB I/A.

History

Club names
 Pécsi VSK
 PVSK-Co-Order
 PVSK-Dália
 PVSK-MiZo
 MiZo-Pécsi VSK
 MiZo Pécs
 MiZo Pécs 2010
 Pécs 2010

Honours
International
 EuroLeague Bronze: 2001, 2004
 EuroLeague 4th: 2005
National
 National Championship: 11 (1991–92, 1994–95, 1995–96, 1997–98, 1999–2000, 2000–01, 2002–03, 2003–04, 2004–05, 2005–06, 2009–10)
 Hungarian Cup: 11 (1997, 1998, 1999, 2000, 2001, 2002, 2003, 2005, 2006, 2009, 2010)

International history

Last (2011-12) roster

Notable players
Allie Quigley, Krisztina Raksányi, Stefanie Lynn Murphy, Sara Krnjić, Dalma Iványi, Zsófia Fegyverneky, Nóra Nagy-Bujdosó, Anna Vajda, Kelly Mazzante, Nicole Ohlde, Jennifer Whittle, Tijana Krivacevic, Simone Edwards, Vickie Johnson, Ekaterina Lisina, Svetlana Boiko, Albena Branzova, Allison Tranquilli, Andrea Károlyi, Eszter Ujvári, Érika de Souza, Slobodanka Tuvic, Magdolna Csák, Maria Stepanova, Jolanta Vilutyté, Éva Sztojkovics, Hajnalka Balázs, Sandra Mandir

Retired number
 11 Judit Horváth

Famous coaches
 László Rátgéber (1993–2008)

External links
 

Women's basketball teams in Hungary
Basketball teams established in 1946
EuroLeague Women clubs
Pécs